The Second Brazer Building is an historic office building at 25-29 State Street in Boston, Massachusetts, with a locally significant early Beaux Arts design.

The eleven-story skycraper was designed by Cass Gilbert and built in 1897. It is the only Gilbert work in Boston, and was built in the same year he won the commission for the Minnesota State Capitol. The building is an early local example of a steel frame structure with curtain walls. It has a trapezoidal plan and is 125 feet in height, with identical fenestration patterns on the northern, eastern, and southern facades. The exterior walls are made of limestone for the first three stories and terra cotta for the upper floors.

The tower occupies the site of the first meeting house in Boston, erected in 1632; a plaque on the north facade of the building marks its former location. The land was subsequently acquired in the early nineteenth century by John Brazer, a local merchant, and in 1842 his heirs constructed the first Brazer Building, a three-story Greek Revival structure designed by Isaiah Rogers. The original Brazer building stood on the site until 1896, when it was removed to make way for the current tower.

The building was listed on the National Register of Historic Places in 1986. It was designated as a Boston Landmark by the Boston Landmarks Commission on July 9, 1985.

See also 
 National Register of Historic Places listings in northern Boston, Massachusetts

References

Office buildings on the National Register of Historic Places in Massachusetts
Cass Gilbert buildings
Skyscraper office buildings in Boston
National Register of Historic Places in Boston

Office buildings completed in 1896